This is a list of environmental periodicals, in print and online, focused on various aspects of the biophysical environment, the built environment, humans' relations to those environments, and other environment topics. This list presently includes literary magazines, general-interest magazines, newsletters, and others.

(For peer-reviewed academic journals, see the List of environmental journals. For online or hybrid periodicals, see also List of environmental websites.)

Literary magazines 
The Bear Deluxe — based out of Portland, Oregon, United States
Camas: The Nature of the West — run by graduate students at the University of Montana
Whole Terrain: Journal of Reflective Environmental Practice — published approximately once a year by Antioch University New England

Newsletters and newspapers 
TerraGreen  —  Monthly Magazine on environment, energy, and sustainable development in India by The Energy and Resources Institute
ClimateWire — daily news service by Environment & Energy Publishing, USA
Down to Earth — science and environment magazine fortnightly published in India by the Centre for Science and Environment
The ENDS Report — based in the UK and published by Environmental Data Services Ltd.
EU Forest Watch — monthly forest issues newsletter focusing on the European Union, published by FERN
Greenwire — daily electronic newsletter by Environment & Energy Publishing, USA
Hawaii Island Journal — published on the Big Island of Hawaii
Manchester Climate Fortnightly — published (online and on recycled paper) in Manchester, England

Popular magazines
A\J: Alternatives Journal — official publication of the Environmental Studies Association of Canada; based in Waterloo, Ontario
Checkerspot — published by the Canadian Wildlife Federation
E–The Environmental Magazine — published by the Earth Action Network, based in Escondido, California
Earth First! Journal — published by Earth First!
Ecology and Law — quarterly environmental advocacy and news magazine of the Bellona Foundation, Saint Petersburg, Russia
ECOS (Australia) — Australian environmental magazine published by CSIRO
ECOS (UK) — quarterly publication of the British Association of Nature Conservationists
 El Ecologista (Spain) — quarterly publication of Ecologistas en Acción
Environment magazine — "Science and Policy for Sustainable Development," published in Philadelphia by Taylor & Francis
The Environmentalist — public interest, eco-investigative online magazine
Environment Coastal & Offshore (ECO) — multi-media global publication focused on coastal and ocean environmental issues. Founded in 2012. Published by TSC Publishing in Stuart, Florida. 
G: The Green Lifestyle Magazine — published in Sydney, Australia
Gobar Times — monthly environmental education magazine for young adults, published in India by the Centre for Science and Environment
Green Car Journal
The Green Guide — produced by the National Geographic Society
Grist (online magazine) — headquartered in Seattle, Washington
High Country News — magazine, website, and op-ed column addressing public lands, water, natural resources, grazing, wilderness, wildlife, logging, growth and other issues in the American West
Home Power — based in Ashland, Oregon
InsideClimate News (online magazine) — based in Brooklyn, New York
Mongabay (online magazine) — based in Menlo Park, California
Mother Earth News — based in Topeka, Kansas
Natural History — published by the American Museum of Natural History, aiming to promote public understanding and appreciation of nature and science
Natural Home & Garden — American bimonthly magazine about sustainable homes and lifestyle
Natural Life — based in Canada and owned by Life Media
Orion — published by the Orion Society and based in Great Barrington, Massachusetts
Piemonte Parchi — former paper magazine now on-line, published in Italy by the Piedmont Regional Government
ReNew — Australian magazine first published by the Alternative Energy Co-operative in 1980
Resurgence & Ecologist — British bi-monthly green magazine
Sanctuary Asia — India's first and one of its leading environmental news magazines
Sierra Magazine — the national magazine of the Sierra Club

Specialized periodicals 
Chinadialogue — online magazine based in London, Beijing and San Francisco
Corporate Knights — quarterly Canadian magazine focusing on corporate social and environmental responsibility
Earth Negotiations Bulletin — internet publication covering international environmental negotiations, workshops and conferences, published by the Reporting Services arm of the International Institute for Sustainable Development
The ENDS Report — published monthly by Environmental Data Services Ltd, now part of the Haymarket Group
Journal of Contemporary Water Research & Education — published by the Universities Council on Water Resources
Landscope — quarterly journal of the Western Australia Department of Environment and Conservation
New York State Conservationist — published by the New York State Department of Environmental Conservation
Noise & Health — published by Medknow Publications on behalf of the Noise Research Network
Organic Matters — published by the Irish Organic Farmers and Growers Association

Defunct periodicals
The Ecologist — British environmental magazine, 1970-2009; now merged with Resurgence
Energy Matters — discontinued; published by students at the University of Cambridge between November 1980 and June 1984
European Nuclear Disarmament Journal — discontinued; bi-monthly magazine of the European Nuclear Disarmament group in the United Kingdom
 Muutoksen kevät — published in Tampere, Finland, 1995—2003.
 Wild Earth — discontinued; published in the United States
Worldchanging — published in San Francisco, then Seattle, Washington, from 2003-2010

See also
List of environmental journals — for peer-reviewed, scholarly periodicals
List of environmental websites
Lists of environmental publications

External links 
EnviroInfo: list of environmental periodicals

Periodicals
Lists of magazines